The Women's Overall in the 2022 FIS Alpine Skiing World Cup consisted of 37 events in 5 disciplines: downhill (DH), Super-G (SG), giant slalom (GS), slalom (SL), and parallel (PAR). The sixth discipline, Alpine combined (AC), had all of its events in the 2021–22 season cancelled due to the continuing schedule disruption cased by the COVID-19 pandemic, which also happened in 2020-21. In an adjustment that was partially motivated by the pandemic, each of the four main disciplines had nine races, while the parallel discipline had only one.  The season did not have any cancellations.

The season was interrupted by the 2022 Winter Olympics in Beijing, China (at the Yanqing National Alpine Skiing Centre in Yanqing District) from 6–19 February 2022.

In the 35th event of the season, with just two events in the finals remaining, three-time overall champion Mikaela Shiffrin of the United States clinched her fourth championship, building an insurmountable 236-point lead over defending overall champion Petra Vlhová of Slovakia.  Although Shiffrin had a huge lead early in the season, she then had a bout with COVID and also skipped several races both while preparing for and then immediately after the Winter Olympics, giving Vlhová a chance to catch up (of which she took advantage). However, Shiffrin re-established her lead in the first events in March. After Vlhová closed to 56 points, Shiffrin won the downhill at the World Cup finals, an event in which she rarely competes, to re-establish a triple-digit lead, and her second place in the next day's Super-G clinched Shiffrin's fourth overall title, drawing her even with Lindsey Vonn and behind only Annemarie Moser-Pröll, who won six, among women.

The last events of the season took place at the World Cup final, Wednesday, 16 March through Sunday, 20 March in the linked resorts of Courchevel and Méribel, France, which are located in Les Trois Vallées. Only the top 25 in each specific discipline for the season and the winner of the Junior World Championship in each discipline were eligible to compete in the final, with the exception that athletes who have scored at least 500 points in the overall classification were eligible to participate in any discipline, regardless of their standing in that discipline for the season.

Standings

See also
 2022 Alpine Skiing World Cup – Women's summary rankings
 2022 Alpine Skiing World Cup – Women's Downhill
 2022 Alpine Skiing World Cup – Women's Super-G
 2022 Alpine Skiing World Cup – Women's Giant Slalom
 2022 Alpine Skiing World Cup – Women's Slalom
 2022 Alpine Skiing World Cup – Women's Parallel
 2022 Alpine Skiing World Cup – Men's Overall
 World Cup scoring system

References

External links
 Alpine Skiing at FIS website

Women's overall
FIS Alpine Ski World Cup overall titles